Homecoming is the second official live album by the Scottish hard rock band Nazareth, released in 2002. Recorded in Glasgow, Scotland in 2001, it may be regarded as the soundtrack to the DVD of the same name, with stage talk edited to allow the tracks to fit onto a single CD.

The CD tray insert states "The Greatest Hits Live In Glasgow".

Track listing

Personnel
Dan McCafferty - lead vocals, bagpipe talk box in "Hair of the Dog"
Jimmy Murrison - guitars, backing vocals in "Hair of the Dog"
Pete Agnew - bass guitar, backing vocals
Ronnie Leahy - keyboards
Lee Agnew - drums

References

Nazareth (band) live albums
2001 live albums